= List of centres affiliated to the University of Calcutta =

The University of Calcutta, which is located in Kolkata, West Bengal is one of the oldest and most renowned educational institutions in South Asia. It was established in 1857. There are several colleges and institutes that are affiliated to this university. At present there are approximately 160 institutes which comes under this university, which are mostly located in the districts of Kolkata, Howrah, Hooghly, and South 24 Parganas.

== List of affiliated centres ==
This is the list of centres:

- A. K. Choudhury School of Information Technology
- Women's Studies Research Centre
- Gandhian Studies Centre
- Centre for Urban Economic Studies
- S. K. Mitra Centre for Space Environment
- Peace Studies Research Centre
- Centre for Testing and Training for Providing Technical Back up to the Beneficiaries for Agricultural and Horticultural Development
- USIC
- Centre for Horticultural Studies
- CPEPA-UGC center for “Electrophysiology & Neuro-Imaging studies including Mathematical Modeling”
- Centre for Millimeter Wave Semiconductor Devices & Systems
- Centre for Pakistan and West Asian Studies
- Centre for Research in Nanoscience and Nanotechnology
- Centre for Social Sciences and Humanities
- Centre for South and Southeast Asian Studies
- Centre for Studies in Book Publishing
- Nehru Studies Centre
- Centre for the Study of Social Exclusion and Inclusive Policy
- Institute of Foreign Policy Studies
- Centre for Pollination Studies
- University of Calcutta – Calcutta Stock Exchange Centre of Excellence in Financial Markets
- S N Pradhan Centre for Neurosciences
